Kommaly Chanthavong is a traditional silk weaver and founder of Mulberries in Laos. She is recipient of Ramon Magsaysay Award in 2015 for the passion for her silk weaving skill that revived and developed the ancient Laotian art creating livelihoods for thousands of poor and war-displaced Laotians.

References

Year of birth missing (living people)
Living people
21st-century Laotian women